Ipplepen is a village and civil parish located within the Teignbridge district of the county of Devon in south-west England. A priory was located there. There is an electoral ward with the same name. The population at the 2011 census is 2,469.

Location
Other nearby villages include Torbryan, Broadhempston, Denbury, Marldon and Abbotskerswell.

Amenities
Ipplepen now has one public house ('The Wellington') and it is situated close to the heart of the village and alongside the main road. The village's second public house ('The Plough Inn') was closed in January 2009 and then put up for sale, it was adjacent to the Conservative Club. There is also a primary school, park, bowling club, village hall, post office, general store, two churches, a medical centre and a Football Club with a very good youth section. The village library was temporarily closed in 2008, while a new library building was being built. The main transport link is the A381 road to Newton Abbot and Totnes.

St Andrews Anglican parish church is a Grade I listed building.

Population
The population of Ipplepen during 1801 and 1901 was 821 and 813 respectively. By the time of the 1991 Census in the United Kingdom, the population of 'Ipplepen with Torbryan' had increased to 2446. The average age was 42 years and 68.9% were described as being in 'good health'.

Archaeology
Archaeological excavations in Ipplepen have found Roman coins, a portion of a Roman road, a Roman age butcher shop, and various broken ceramics of Mediterranean and Gallic origin which once contained wine, olive oil and garum (fish sauce).

In February 2015 it was announced that a "major" Roman cemetery, including 15 skeletons, had been discovered during an archaeological dig at Ipplepen. Archaeologists said that the discoveries were both nationally and regionally important. One of the skeletons tested showed that the settlement was in use up to 350 years after the Roman period had ended in about 410 AD. The site was originally discovered by metal detectorists.

Notable residents
Notable residents of the past and present include:
 Sir Alfred Langler – journalist and editor
 Rev. John Hewett was rural dean of Ipplepen
 Bertram Fletcher Robinson – journalist, editor & author.
 Jon Lee – actor and former vocalist with the pop group S Club 7, was born in Ipplepen.
 David St John Thomas - writer and publisher
William John Wills (1834–1861) - explorer of Australia

References

External links

 Ipplepen Parish Council.
 Ipplepen.Info.
 Ipplepen at GenUKI.

Villages in Devon